Gábor Molnár may refer to:
 Gábor Molnár (weightlifter)
 Gábor Molnár (footballer)